This list of airports in Marshall Islands is sorted by location. For a list sorted by ICAO code, see List of airports by ICAO code: P#PK - Marshall Islands.

List of airports

Marshall Islands
 
Airports
Marshall Islands